Texas Proposition 3 may refer to various ballot measures in Texas, including:

2007 Texas Proposition 3
2021 Texas Proposition 3